Lukino is a rural locality (a village) in Gorodishchenskoye Rural Settlement, Nyuksensky District, Vologda Oblast, Russia. The population was 26 as of 2002.

Geography 
Lukino is located 44 km southeast of Nyuksenitsa (the district's administrative centre) by road. Slobodka is the nearest rural locality.

References 

Rural localities in Nyuksensky District